The 2021 Championship League was a professional ranking snooker tournament that took place from 18 July to 13 August 2021 at the Morningside Arena in Leicester, England. The event featured 128 players and was played as three rounds of round-robin groups of four, before a best-of-five final. It was the 17th edition of the Championship League and the first ranking tournament of the 2021–22 snooker season. It was one of two Championship League events held over the season, with a following invitational event held as the 2022 Championship League (invitational).

Kyren Wilson was the defending champion, having defeated Judd Trump 3–1 in the final of the September to October 2020 edition of the tournament. Wilson's title defence ended in Stage Three, where he finished third in his group. David Gilbert won the tournament, defeating Mark Allen 3–1 to win his first ranking title. Allen made the highest  of the event, a 146.

Format
The 2021 Championship League was hosted from 18 July to 13 August 2021 at the Morningside Arena in Leicester, England.
128 players took part in the event. The competition began with 32 rounds of group matches with each group consisting of four players. Two groups were played to a finish every day during three blocks, from 18 to 23 July, from 26 to 30 July and from 2 to 6 August, using a two-table setup in the arena. The groups were contested using a round-robin format, with six matches played in each group. All matches in group play were played as best-of-four frames, with three points awarded for a win and one point for a draw. Group positions were determined by points scored, frame difference and then head-to-head results between players who were tied. Places that were still tied were then determined by the highest  made in the group.

The 32 players that topped the group tables qualified for the group winners' stage, consisting of eight groups of four players. The eight winners from the group winners' stage qualified for the two final groups, with the final taking place later on the same day. The winner took the Championship League title and a place at the 2021 Champion of Champions.

Prize fund 
The breakdown of prize money for the tournament is shown below.

Stage One
Winner: £3,000
Runner-up: £2,000
Third place: £1,000
Fourth place: £0

Stage Two
Winner: £4,000
Runner-up: £3,000
Third place: £2,000
Fourth place: £1,000

Stage Three
Winner: £6,000
Runner-up: £4,000
Third place: £2,000
Fourth place: £1,000

Final
Winner: £20,000
Runner-up: £10,000

Tournament total: £328,000

Summary

The first stage was held over 32 groups with 128 participants between 18 July and 6 August. Peter Lines won group eight over Mark Williams after winning their match 3-0, despite losing to Jak Jones. Noppon Saengkham won all three of his matches, including over four-time world champion John Higgins to win group 9. This was Saengkham's first professional match since being forced to withdraw from the 2021 World Snooker Championship due to a positive case of COVID-19. World number 115 won group 24, with wins over John Astley and Stephen Maguire. Former UK Championship winner Maguire finished bottom of the group. Defending champion Wilson lost just two frames as he won group 16.

The second stage was held over 8 groups with 32 participants between 9 and 12 August. Tom Ford won group A, after he completed a whitewash over world number one Judd Trump. Ali Carter won group E over two former world snooker champions Shaun Murphy and Graeme Dott, winning all three of his group matches 3-1. Ronnie O'Sullivan, who had won group 32, withdrew from the event, and was replaced by second placed Mark Joyce. Joyce, however, finished bottom of group H, won by David Gilbert.

The final two groups, and the final was played on 13 August. Allen won the first of the stage three groups, completing 3-0 victories over Ford and Wilson, as well as a 3-1 win over Bai Langning. During his win over Wilson, Allen made three century breaks of 127, 124 and 146 (the highest of the tournament), where Wilson scored just two points. Despite a loss in the opening match to Cao Yupeng, Gilbert won the second group after victories over Carter and Ryan Day. The final had Allen win the opening frame with a break of 102, before Gilbert won the remaining three frames with breaks of 59 and 57. This was the first ranking event win of Gilberts 22-year career, having appeared in four previous finals. Gilbert commented after the match that he was "only used to loser's speeches".

Tournament draw

Stage One 
Stage One consisted of 32 groups, each containing four players.

Group 1 

Group 1 was played on 6 August.

Group 2 

Group 2 was played on 21 July.

Group 3 

Group 3 was played on 22 July.

Group 4 

Group 4 was played on 2 August.

Group 5 

Group 5 was played on 6 August.

Group 6 

Group 6 was played on 20 July.

Group 7 

Group 7 was played on 18 July.

Group 8 

Group 8 was played on 18 July.

Group 9 

Group 9 was played on 27 July.

Group 10 

Group 10 was played on 22 July.

Lu Ning was originally due to take part in this group, but withdrew and was replaced by Ben Fortey.

Group 11 

Group 11 was played on 5 August.

Group 12 

Group 12 was played on 23 July.

Group 13 

Group 13 was played on 26 July.

Zhou Yuelong was originally due to take part in this group, but withdrew and was replaced by Joshua Thomond.

Group 14 

Group 14 was played on 26 July.

Group 15 

Group 15 was played on 4 August.

Group 16 

Group 16 was played on 29 July.

Group 17 

Group 17 was played on 4 August.

Group 18 

Group 18 was played on 28 July.

Group 19 

Group 19 was played on 19 July.

Alfie Burden was originally due to take part in this group, but withdrew and was replaced by Sydney Wilson.

Group 20 

Group 20 was played on 29 July.

Group 21 

Group 21 was played on 30 July.

Group 22 

Group 22 was played on 30 July.

Group 23 

Group 23 was played on 19 July.

Group 24 

Group 24 was played on 2 August.

Group 25 

Group 25 was played on 3 August.

Group 26 

Group 26 was played on 27 July.

Group 27 

Group 27 was played on 3 August.

Group 28 

Group 28 was played on 21 July.

Group 29 

Group 29 was played on 28 July.

Group 30 

Group 30 was played on 5 August.

Group 31 

Group 31 was played on 23 July.

Group 32 

Group 32 was played on 20 July.

Ng On-yee was originally due to take part in this group, but withdrew and was replaced by Saqib Nasir.

Stage Two 
Stage Two consisted of eight groups, each containing four players.

Group A 
Group A was played on 12 August.

Group B 
Group B was played on 12 August.

Group C 
Group C was played on 11 August.

Group D 
Group D was played on 11 August.

Group E 
Group E was played on 10 August.

Group F 
Group F was played on 10 August.

Group G 
Group G was played on 9 August.

Group H 
Group H was played on 9 August.

Ronnie O'Sullivan was originally due to take part in this group, but withdrew and was replaced by Mark Joyce.

Stage Three 
Stage Three consisted of two groups, each containing four players.

Group 1 
Group 1 was played on 13 August.

Group 2 
Group 2 was played on 13 August.

Final

Century breaks 
There was a total of 74 century breaks made during the tournament. The highest break was made by Mark Allen, who made a 146 in his stage three match against Kyren Wilson.

 146, 137, 127, 124, 124, 123, 115, 110, 103, 102  Mark Allen
 143, 139, 131, 100  David Gilbert
 140, 100  Jimmy Robertson
 137, 125  Stuart Carrington
 136, 134  Ryan Day
 134, 116  Stuart Bingham
 133  Craig Steadman
 132  Mitchell Mann
 130, 129, 114, 104  Yan Bingtao
 130, 111  Matthew Stevens
 130  John Higgins
 130  Martin O'Donnell
 128  Judd Trump
 127, 125  Chang Bingyu
 127  Andy Hicks
 125, 115, 100  Peter Lines
 125, 112, 105, 104, 101  Ricky Walden
 124  Tom Ford
 122  Barry Pinches
 119  Anthony Hamilton
 119  Soheil Vahedi
 118  Bai Langning
 117, 113  Cao Yupeng
 117  Gary Wilson
 116  Joe O'Connor
 115  Louis Heathcote
 114, 108  Noppon Saengkham
 113, 102  Mark Davis
 112, 104  Michael White
 111, 103  Yuan Sijun
 111, 100  Thepchaiya Un-Nooh
 111  Robert Milkins
 107  Barry Hawkins
 106  Graeme Dott
 103, 100  Kyren Wilson
 102  Jamie Jones
 102  Sydney Wilson
 100  Shaun Murphy
 100  Fergal O'Brien
 100  Dean Young

References

External links 
 Matchroom Sport – Championship League Snooker
 World Snooker Tour – Calendar 2021/2022 

2021 (2)
2021 in snooker
2021 in English sport
July 2021 sports events in the United Kingdom
August 2021 sports events in the United Kingdom
2021 Championship League